Shenyang Medical College is a medical institution of higher learning in Shenyang, Liaoning Province, P. R. China. It was formerly known as Shenyang Municipal Advanced Practice Nurse School . The school opened in 1949 and was renamed Shenyang Advanced Medical School, directly managed under the provincial administration, in 1958. It was upgraded to Shenyang Medical College in 1987. The college expanded in size, increased the number of specialties offered and improved in operations. It established a multi-tier education system involving bachelor degree (MBBS) education, advanced diploma education and adult education. It graduated more than 30,000 students.

Basic information
Its current fixed assets are valued at 680 million yuan. Among these assets is the library collection, which contains 2,163 different Chinese and foreign periodicals. The college also has six foreign database teachings, worth 776,000 yuan; research equipment, worth 66.18 million yuan; and other miscellaneous equipment sets, worth 600 million yuan. Campus network information points are found  throughout the campus.

Faculty
Shenyang Medical College has a staff of 3,389 people, including the staff of affiliated hospitals. 631 staff members are full-time teachers, 73 are professors, 97 are associate professors; 49 are doctors, and 205 are masters.

External links
Shenyang Medical College Official Website

Universities and colleges in Shenyang
Educational institutions established in 1949
1949 establishments in China